"I Wasn't with It" is a song performed by Jesse Powell. The song is the opening track from his second album 'Bout It and was issued as the album's first single. The song was his  debut on the Billboard Hot 100, and it peaked at #40 in 1998.

Music video

The official music video for the song was directed by Steve Willis.

Chart performance

References

External links
 

1998 singles
Jesse Powell songs
Silas Records singles
Song recordings produced by Jon-John Robinson
1998 songs